Yusuf Haji Nur (died 23 June 2019) was a Somali politician and lawyer. He was Chief Justice of Puntland.

On 1 July 2001, he declared himself acting President of Puntland after the end of the presidential term of Abdullahi Yusuf Ahmed. However, the former President rejected Yusuf Haji's claim and insisted that he was the legitimate President, which led to a two-year civil war in Puntland. Yusuf served as interim President until 14 November 2001. He later became an independent lawyer and headed PARA LEGAL, a law firm for people who couldn't afford to pay for legal proceedings.

On 16 August 2016, Puntland President Abdiweli Mohamed Ali appointed Nur as Chief Justice of the Puntland Supreme Court. Prior to this, Nur held this position under Abdullahi Yusuf Ahmed. On 21 August 2016, Yusuf took office.

In June 2019, Yusuf Haji Nur died in Turkey. On 23 June, Puntland President Said Abdullahi Dani expressed his condolences to the politician's close relatives and friends. Also expressing condolences on the death of Nur were the Director of information for the President of Somalia, Abdinur Mohamed Ahmed, and the speaker of the Puntland House of Representatives, Abdihakin Mohamed Ahmed Dhobo Daarid. He was buried on 28 June 2019.

References

Presidents of Puntland
Year of birth missing
2019 deaths